Qadi 'Abd al-Wahhab ibn Ali ibn Naṣr ibn Ahmad ibn Hussein ibn Harun ibn Malik ibn Tawk al-Taghlibi (973 – 1035CE) (362 AH – 422 AH ), also known as Qadi Abdul Wahhab and Qadi 'Abd al-Wahhab al-Maliki was an important Iraqi jurist in the Maliki school. He was a seminal figure of the now extinct Iraqi School of the Maliki madhab. Qadi 'Abd al-Wahhab is also remembered for his knowledge of Arabic literature and poetry. He is known by the title Qadi meaning judge in Arabic, as he was a prominent judge in Abbasid Siirt and Badra. He is best known for his work at-Talqin on Maliki fiqh which is still studied today, particularly for its recording of the positions of the Iraqi school of the Maliki madhab.

Life 
'Abd al-Wahhab was born in Baghdad in 973 CE (362 AH) when Abbasid control was largely confined to a titular and spiritual role under al-Muti. The Shiite Buyid Dynasty largely dominated the political and military arena. Despite this, he studied under some of the most prominent Sunni Maliki scholars of Baghdad, most notably the Iraqi jurists Al-Abhari and Ibn al-Jallab as well as the Ash'ari theologian al-Baqillani. During the latter part of his life, he lived in poverty in Baghdad, and eventually left his hometown. It is recorded that on the day of his departure, he was followed by a group of notable civil servants to escort him to whom he reportedly responded:

Qadi 'Abd al-Wahhab moved to the Levant firstly, and then to Egypt where he settled. His fortunes changed in Egypt where he was highly regarded as a scholar. He died in 1031, allegedly of food poisoning. He was buried in the Qarafa cemetery in Cairo between the tomb of Imam al-Shafi and the gates of Qarafa. His tomb is near that of Ibn al-Qasim and Ashhab, two notable direct students of Imam Malik.

References 

Maliki fiqh scholars
Iraqi scholars
Iraqi Maliki scholars
1031 deaths
973 births
10th-century Arabs
11th-century Arabs
10th-century scholars
11th-century scholars
10th-century people from the Abbasid Caliphate
11th-century people from the Abbasid Caliphate
11th-century jurists